Patrick Robinson (born 13 August 1994) is a British professional freeride mountain biker. He is the three-time reigning champion for the Street Velodrome cycling discipline.

Having been featured on BT Sports and The Bike channel beating olympians such as Craig MacLean. He is also a well known favourite in Mexico and Chile participating in Red Bull's urban street racing event, performing his infamous front and back-flip stunts. Robinson is also the founder of his own sports company.

Prior to signing professional, Robinson worked as a Lifeguard for Nuffield Health. He is the son of Jason Robinson and the brother of Lewis Tierney, both professional rugby league players.

Team
Patrick Robinson is currently part of the Insync bikes (Hero Cycles) Mountain Bike team. Robinson Signed with Insync Bikes early 2018. Robinson is also sponsored by Poc Sports.

Achievement 

2018
 Gold Winner Streetvelodrome tour 2018

2017
 Gold Winner Streetvelodrome tour 2017

2016
 Gold Winner Streetvelodrome tour 2016

2015

References

External links
 Official Streetvelodrome website
 Insyncbikes website
 Poc sports website
 Watu Sports website

English male cyclists
1994 births
Living people
Freeride mountain bikers
Sportspeople from Wakefield
Cyclists from Yorkshire
Alumni of St Mary's University, Twickenham
English people of Scottish descent
English people of Jamaican descent